Jaroslav Mach (born 4 May 1887, date of death unknown) was a Czech sports shooter. He competed at the 1924 Summer Olympics and the 1936 Summer Olympics.

References

External links
 

1887 births
Year of death missing
Czech male sport shooters
Olympic shooters of Czechoslovakia
Shooters at the 1924 Summer Olympics
Shooters at the 1936 Summer Olympics
Place of birth missing